The  Kansas City Chiefs season was the franchise's 18th season in the National Football League and the 28th overall.
Under new head coach Frank Gansz, The Chiefs split their first two games never recovered and the Chiefs replacement players went 0–3. After the regulars returned, the Chiefs continued to struggle losing their next five games to stand at 1–9. The Chiefs would go on to finish with a 4–11 record, a year after making the playoffs in 1986.

Offseason 
One of the most tumultuous weeks in franchise history took place following the club's playoff loss against the Jets in the 1986 playoffs. Assistant head coach and special teams coach Frank Gansz, resigned his position on January 7 in order to pursue opportunities as an NFL offensive coordinator. The following day, the Chiefs announced in an impromptu press conference that John Mackovic was relieved of his duties as head coach on January 8. A popular figure among Chiefs players, Gansz was reinstated on January 10 and was named the sixth head coach in franchise history.

Former quarterback Len Dawson became the third Chiefs player inducted into the Pro Football Hall of Fame on August 8, while injuries forced the retirement of the club's all-time leading tackler Gary Spani.

NFL draft

Personnel

Staff

Replacement players 
After the league decided to use replacement players during the NFLPA strike, the following team was assembled:

Roster

Season summary
A duo of rookies made a splash in a 20–13 win on Opening Day against San Diego as running back Paul Palmer returned a kickoff for a TD and Christian Okoye dashed for 105 yards. A 24-day players strike began on September 22, canceling the club's contest against Minnesota. Replacement players participated in games for the next three weeks. Much like Marv Levy five years earlier, Gansz's grip on the club's coaching reins was crippled by the labor unrest.

Kansas City's replacement squad consisted primarily of players cut in training camp. One of the few bright spots among the players was running back Jitter Fields, who remained on the active roster following the strike. The Chiefs strike squad received an ominous welcome in Los Angeles when in the early morning hours of October 4, the day prior to a contest against the Raiders, an earthquake rattled Southern California. The shaken Chiefs lost a 35–17 decision later that day. The low point of the year came the following week at Miami in the first regular season game played at what then was known as Joe Robbie Stadium. Chiefs replacement QB Matt Stevens was injured early in the contest, forcing into duty backup quarterback Alex Espinoza, who had never taken an NFL snap. The result was a 42–0 Dolphins victory, setting the stage for an 0–3 performance by Kansas City's replacement unit, giving the Chiefs a 1–4 record before the club's regular roster returned at San Diego on October 25. Five straight losses followed, giving the Chiefs a team-record nine-game losing skid. For the only time in team history, five different players started games at quarterback for the club. Behind Kenney, Kansas City won two of its last three games to conclude the strike-shortened 4–11 campaign.

Schedule

Preseason

Regular season 

Note: Intra-division opponents are in bold text.

Game summaries

Week 1: vs. San Diego Chargers

Week 2: at Seattle Seahawks

Week 4: at Los Angeles Raiders

Week 5: at Miami Dolphins

Week 6: vs. Denver Broncos

Week 7: at San Diego Chargers

Week 8: at Chicago Bears

Week 9: vs. Pittsburgh Steelers

Week 10: vs. New York Jets

Week 11: vs. Green Bay Packers

Week 12: at Detroit Lions

Week 13: at Cincinnati Bengals

Week 14: vs. Los Angeles Raiders

Week 15: at Denver Broncos

Week 16: vs. Seattle Seahawks

Standings

References

External links 
 1987 Kansas City Chiefs at Pro-Football-Reference.com

Kansas City Chiefs
Kansas City Chiefs seasons
Kansas